Tavastians are a historic people and a modern subgroup (heimo) of the Finnish people. They live in areas of the historical province of Tavastia (Häme) and speak Tavastian dialects.

History 

Tavastia (Häme in Finnish) has been inhabited since the early Stone Age. The core area of ancient Tavastia was formed around Lake Vanajavesi. Example of organised cooperation of iron age Tavastians are the hillforts that form a clear line in south-north direction around Hämeenlinna. Most remarkable from these hillforts is the Rapola Castle which is the biggest hillfort found in Finland, but also Tenhola hillfort in Hattula and Hakoinen Castle were important fortresses. Villages were often developed around the fortresses and for example Hattula and Vanaja-Janakkala had their beginning in this way. In historical sources Tavastians are first time mentioned in 1042.

Possibly the oldest known road of Finland, Hämeen härkätie (the Ox road of Tavastia) connected Tavastia with the western coast of Finland. First signs of Christianity can be dated to the 11th century.

The Primary Chronicle and Novgorod First Chronicle describe Tavastians in frequent conflicts with Novgorod and Karelians as well as other Baltic Finns from 11th to 14th century.

References

Ethnic groups in Finland